Dan Reitz (born 1954) is an American politician and former Democratic member of the Illinois House of Representatives, representing the 116th District from his July 23, 1997 appointment until he stepped down in May 2011. Jerry Costello II was appointed to serve the remainder of Reitz's term.

Prior to his service in the Illinois House, he was a member of the Randolph County Board. He was succeeded by Jerry Costello.

References

External links
Illinois General Assembly - Representative Dan Reitz (D) 116th District official IL House website
Bills Committees
Project Vote Smart - Representative Dan Reitz (IL) profile
Follow the Money - Dan Reitz
2006 2004 2002 2000 1998 1996 campaign contributions
Illinois House Democrats - Dan Reitz profile

1954 births
Living people
Democratic Party members of the Illinois House of Representatives
People from Red Bud, Illinois
21st-century American politicians
County commissioners in Illinois